The Siuslaw News is a semiweekly newspaper published in Florence, Oregon, United States, since 1904. The News covers western Lane County, from the Pacific Ocean to Deadwood and Greenleaf, and from Yachats on the north to Gardiner on the south. The paper was previously known as the Siuslaw Oar and The West. It is published on Wednesdays and Saturdays by the News Media Corporation and has a circulation of 7,157.

References

External links
Siuslaw News (official website)

Lane County, Oregon
Newspapers published in Oregon
Oregon Coast
Oregon Newspaper Publishers Association
Publications established in 1904
1904 establishments in Oregon